Proca can be:

 Alexandru Proca, Romanian physicist
 Proca action, in physics, named after Alexandru Proca
 , Romanian physician
 , Romanian footballer
 Zeno Proca (1906–1936), Romanian chess player

See also
 Procas, a king in Roman mythology
 Procas granulicollis, a beetle in the family Curculionidae

Romanian-language surnames